Pashtany Bank is the firm controlled by the government of Afghanistan that controls the Da Afghanistan Bank (the central bank of Afghanistan), the Afghan national insurance company and Ariana Afghan Airlines. It was established in 1954 to manage the Da Afghanistan Bank. 

Abdul Aziz Babakarkhail is the CEO and President of Pashtany Bank, which has reached its highest revenue in years under his leadership. The bank has over 20 branches throughout the country. It heavily markets on Afghan Television Channels and had a revenue of 984 million Afghani in 2016.

References

Banks of Afghanistan
Government-owned banks